Gongbei (from  gonbad, meaning "dome", "cupola"), is a term used by the Hui and Uyghur Muslim populations of China in the Northwestern region to indicate an Islamic shrine complex centered on the grave (qabr) of a Ṣūfī Muslim murs̲h̲id ("master") or walī ("saint"), typically the founder of a menhuan (a Chinese Ṣūfī ṭarīḳa, or "saintly lineage"). The grave itself usually is topped with a dome. Similar Islamic facilities with the same purpose, known as dargāh or türbe, can be found in several other regions of the Muslim world.

Between 1958 and 1966, many Ṣūfī shrines and tombs in Ningxia and throughout Northwestern China in general were destroyed, viewed by the Chinese Communist government and authorities as relics of the old "feudal" order and symbols which the Chinese Communist Revolution (1946−1950) had attempted to eradicate through a series of atheistic and anti-religious campaigns, as well as for practical reasons ("wasting valuable farmland"). Once the right to freedom of religion became recognized once again in the 1980s, and much of the land reverted to the control of individual farmers, destroyed gongbei were often rebuilt once again.

Characteristics
In Ningxia, the nearly 70 existing gongbei are divided into three groups.
 As part of a daotang (instructional hall)
 As part of an instructional hall on the same site as a prayer hall that may be with other structures 
 In combination with a mosque
When a site has as mosque, instructional hall, and a gongbei, the gongbei is set apart from the other two.

See also
 Islam in China
 Chinese Islamic architecture

References

Dargahs
Islam in China
Islamic architecture
Religious buildings and structures in China
Sufi shrines